The Crisis Negotiation Unit (CNU) is a specialist unit of the Singapore Police Force under the umbrella of the Special Operations Command. Its teams of specially trained police officers are called upon to defuse life-threatening situations through verbal crisis negotiation techniques for a non-violent resolution.

Officers from the CNU were deployed overseas for the first time to aid in the handling of victims' families and relatives as a result of the 2004 Indian Ocean earthquake.

References

Special Operations Command (Singapore)